The fourth season of the Canadian reality competition show Top Chef Canada was broadcast on Food Network in Canada. It is a Canadian spin-off of Bravo's show Top Chef.

Contestants
14 chefs competed in season four. Names, ages, hometowns, and cities of residence (at time of filming) are from the Food Network Canada website.: In the order eliminated:

Michael Robbins, 29, Vancouver, BC
Ruth Wigman, 31, St. John's, NL (Hometown: Nanaimo, BC)
Dawn Doucette, 41, Vancouver, BC
Gabriela Neda, 26, Caracas, Venezuela
Lauren Marshall, 26, Mount Uniacke, NS 
Karine Moulin, 36, Quebec City, QC
Pierre Lamielle, 34, Calgary, AB (Hometown: North Vancouver, BC)
Shelley Robinson, 50, Vancouver, BC
Evelynn Takoff, 28, Kelowna, BC
Vittorio Colacitti, 32, Toronto, ON
Jesse Vergen, 35, Saint John, NB
Rich Francis, 36, Fort McPherson, NT
Terry Salmond, 30, Kitchener, ON
Rene Rodriguez, 41, Ottawa, ON

Contestant Progress

: Although in the bottom, Rich had won immunity in the quickfire challenge, so he was not eligible to be eliminated.
: Although in the bottom, Shelley had won immunity in the quickfire challenge, so she was not eligible to be eliminated.
: Although in the bottom, Rich and Rene had won immunity in the quickfire challenge, so they were not eligible to be eliminated.
: Starting from this quickfire, immunity is no longer available.
 (WINNER) The chef won the season and was crowned Top Chef.
 (RUNNER-UP) The chef was a runner-up for the season.
 (THIRD-PLACE) The chef placed third in the competition.
 (WIN) The chef won that episode's Elimination Challenge.
 (HIGH) The chef was selected as one of the top entries in the Elimination Challenge, but did not win.
 (LOW) The chef was selected as one of the bottom entries in the Elimination Challenge, but was not eliminated.
 (OUT) The chef lost that week's Elimination Challenge and was out of the competition.
 (IN) The chef neither won nor lost that week's Elimination Challenge. They also were not up to be eliminated.

Episodes

References

Canada, Season 4
2014 Canadian television seasons